Events in the year 1975 in Brazil.

Incumbents

Federal government
 President: General Ernesto Geisel 
 Vice President: 	General Adalberto Pereira dos Santos

Governors 
 Acre: vacant
 Alagoas: Afrânio Lages (till 15 March); Divaldo Suruagy (from 15 March)
 Amazonas: João Walter de Andrade (till 15 March); Henoch da Silva Reis (from 15 March)
 Bahia: Antônio Carlos Magalhães then Roberto Santos 
 Ceará: César Cals (until 15 March); José Adauto Bezerra (from 15 March)
 Espírito Santo: Artur Carlos Gerhardt Santos (until 15 March); Élcio Álvares (from 15 March)
 Goiás: Leonino Caiado (until 15 March); Irapuan Costa Jr. (from 15 March)
 Guanabara: Antonio de Pádua Chagas Freitas (until 15 March)
 Maranhão: Pedro Neiva de Santana (until 15 March); Oswaldo da Costa Nunes Freire (from 31 March)
 Mato Grosso: José Fragelli then Jose Garcia Neto 
 Minas Gerais: Rondon Pacheco (until 15 March); Aureliano Chaves (from 15 March)
 Pará: Fernando Guilhon (until 15 March); Aloysio Chaves (from 15 March)
 Paraíba: Ernâni Sátiro (until 15 March); Ivan Bichara (from 15 March)
 Paraná: Emílio Hoffmann Gomes then Jaime Canet Júnior 
 Pernambuco: Eraldo Gueiros (until 15 March); Francisco Moura Cavalcanti (from 15 March)
 Piauí: Alberto Silva (until 15 March); Dirceu Arcoverde (from 15 March)
 Rio de Janeiro: Floriano P. Faria Lima
 Rio Grande do Norte: Jose Pereira de Araújo Cortez (until 15 March); Tarcisio de Vasconcelos Maia (from 15 March)
 Rio Grande do Sul: Euclides Triches (until 15 March); Sinval Sebastião Duarte Guazzelli (from 15 March)
 Santa Catarina: Colombo Salles (until 15 March); Antônio Carlos Konder Reis (from 15 March)
 São Paulo: Laudo Natel (until 15 March); Paulo Egídio Martins (from 15 March)
 Sergipe: Paulo Barreto de Menezes (until 15 March); José Rollemberg (from 15 March)

Vice governors
 Acre: Alberto Barbosa da Costa (until 15 March); Omar Sabino de Paula (from 15 March)
 Alagoas: José de Medeiros Tavares (until 15 March); Antônio Gomes de Barro (from 15 March)
 Amazonas: Deoclides de Carvalho Leal (until 15 March); João Bosco Ramos de Lima (from 15 March)
 Bahia: Menandro Minahim (until 15 March); Edvaldo Brandão Correia (from 15 March)
 Ceará: Francisco Humberto Bezerra (until 15 March); José Waldemar de Alcântara e Silva (from 15 March)
 Espírito Santo: Henrique Pretti (until 15 March); Carlos Alberto Lindenberg von Schilgen (from 15 March) 
 Goiás: Ursulino Tavares Leão (until 15 March); José Luís Bittencourt (from 15 March)
 Maranhão: Alexandre Sá Colares Moreira (until 15 March); José Duailibe Murad (from 15 March)
 Mato Grosso: José Monteiro de Figueiredo (until 15 March); Cássio Leite de Barros (from 15 March)
 Minas Gerais: Celso Porfírio de Araújo Machado (until 15 March); Levindo Ozanam Coelho (from 15 March)
 Pará: Newton Burlamaqui Barreira (until 15 March); Clovis Silva de Morais Rego (from 15 March)
 Paraíba: Clóvis Bezerra Cavalcanti (until 15 March); Dorgival Terceiro Neto (from 15 March)
 Paraná: Jaime Canet Júnior (until 15 March); Octávio Cesário Pereira Júnior (from 15 March)
 Pernambuco: José Antônio Barreto Guimarães (until 15 March); Paulo Gustavo de Araújo Cunha (from 15 March)
 Piauí: Sebastião Rocha Leal (until 15 March); Djalma Martins Veloso (from 15 March)
 Rio Grande do Norte: Tertius Rebelo (until 15 March); Geraldo Melo (from 15 March)
 Rio de Janeiro: Teotônio Araújo (until 15 March); vacant thereafter (from 15 March)
 Rio Grande do Sul: Edmar Fetter (until 15 March); José Augusto Amaral de Sousa (from 15 March)
 Santa Catarina: Atílio Francisco Xavier Fontana (until 15 March); Marcos Henrique Büechler(from 15 March)  
 São Paulo: Antonio José Rodrigues Filho (until 15 March); Ferreira Filho (from 15 March) 
 Sergipe: Adalberto Moura (until 15 March); Antônio Ribeiro Sotelo (from 15 March)

Events

March 
 March 15 - The state of Guanabara merges into the state of Rio de Janeiro, in accordance to a complementary law approved the previous year.

Births 
 6 January – Ricardo Santos, beach volleyball player
 30 January – Juninho Pernambucano, footballer
 14 April - Anderson Silva, mixed martial artist
 10 May - Hélio Castroneves, racing driver
 16 July - Ana Paula Arósio, actress and model
 22 August – Rodrigo Santoro, actor
 7 September – Renato Sobral, martial artist
 14 November – Luizão, footballer

Deaths

References

See also 
1975 in Brazilian football
1975 in Brazilian television

 
1970s in Brazil
Years of the 20th century in Brazil
Brazil
Brazil